Gregory Michael Aymond (born November 12, 1949) is an American prelate of the Roman Catholic Church. He became the fourteenth archbishop of the Archdiocese of New Orleans in Louisiana on June 12, 2009.

Aymond  had previously served as bishop of the Diocese of Austin in Texas from 2001 to 2009, as coadjutor bishop of the same diocese from 2000 to 2001 and as an auxiliary bishop of New Orleans from 1997 to 2000.

Biography

Early life and education 
The oldest of three children, Gregory Aymond was born on November 12, 1949, in the Gentilly neighborhood of New Orleans, Louisiana. He attended St. James Major Elementary School, and evacuated New Orleans with his family by skiff after Hurricane Betsy in 1965. After graduating from Cor Jesu High School in New Orleans in 1967, he studied at St. Joseph Seminary College in Saint Benedict, Louisiana, until 1971. He then attended Notre Dame Seminary in New Orleans, obtaining his Master of Divinity degree in 1975. He then furthered his studies at the Institute for Ministry at Loyola University New Orleans.

Priesthood 
Aymond was ordained to the priesthood for the Archdiocese of New Orleans by Archbishop Philip Hannan on May 10, 1975. He then served as a professor and later rector at St. John Vianney Preparatory School in New Orleans until 1981, when he became director of education and professor of pastoral theology and homiletics at Notre Dame Seminary. From 1986 to 2000, he served as president-rector of Notre Dame; his tenure was the longest in the seminary's history.

During his priestly ministry, he also served as executive director of the Department of Christian Formation, with responsibility for Catholic schools and religious education. He was director of Society for the Propagation of the Faith and was a member of its national board (1977–2000). During the 1980s, Aymond and other Notre Dame traveled to Mexico to build houses and provide religious training. In 1994 he founded Christ the Healer, a medical mission program of the Archdiocese of New Orleans in Granada, Nicaragua.

Auxiliary Bishop of New Orleans 
On November 19, 1996, Aymond was appointed auxiliary bishop of the Archdiocese of  New Orleans and titular bishop of Acholla by Pope John Paul II. He received his episcopal consecration on January 10, 1997, from Archbishop Francis Schulte, with Archbishops Philip Hannan and John Favalora serving as co-consecrators.

Brian Matherne sex abuse case 
As an auxiliary bishop of New Orleans, one of Aymond's duties included the oversight of Catholic schools in the archdiocese. In 1998, Aymond allowed Brian Matherne, a coach at Sacred Heart of Jesus School in Norco, to remain in his post for several months after receiving information from an alleged abuse victim's father that Matherne had molested his son 13 years earlier. He dropped the matter without alerting police after unsuccessful attempts to speak to the alleged victim, then 24 years old, who later told the St. Charles Parish Sheriff's Office about the matter.

Matherne was arrested and pled guilty to molesting 17 children over 15 years. He is serving a 30-year sentence in the Louisiana State Penitentiary. Aymond defended the church, but later stated he should have fired Matherne. In Austin three years later, Aymond began tightening the diocese's sex abuse policy, based partly on the Matherne case stating: "That painful experience – I will never forget it. It helped me to understand the complexity of pedophilia better."

Coadjutor Bishop and Bishop of Austin 
Aymond was named coadjutor bishop of the Diocese of Austin on June 2, 2000, by John Paul II; he was installed on August 3, 2000. He  succeeded John E. McCarthy as the fourth bishop of Austin on January 2, 2001. The diocese grew rapidly (partly as a result of immigration) during Aymond's bishopric and actually had more churchgoers than many archdioceses, including New Orleans after Hurricane Katrina.

Archbishop of New Orleans 
On June 12, 2009, Pope Benedict XVI named Aymond the 14th archbishop of the Archdiocese of New Orleans. He was installed on August 20, 2009, at the Saint Louis Cathedral. He continues, within the United States Conference of Catholic Bishops, to chair the Committee for the Protection of Children and Young People and sits on the Committees for Campus Ministry, Education, Laity, and World Missions.  In an ceremony in 2009 at St. Peter's Basilica in Rome, Benedict XVI bestowed the pallium upon Aymond.

Aymond has faced challenges in "the aftermath of years of sex scandals and the unpopular consolidation of parishes and closing of churches for economic reasons" as phrased by Kevin McGill of the Associated Press. Even so, he said, "Never in my wildest dreams did I think I would come back here as [arch]bishop." Shortly after his appointment as archbishop, the Survivors Network of those Abused by Priests issued a statement claiming he only "postures as someone who takes clergy sex crimes seriously".

Aymond's predecessor, Archbishop Alfred Hughes, implemented a controversial post-hurricane Katrina church consolidation program that reduced the diocese from 142 parishes to 108. The storm drove away nearly a quarter of its former membership and left it with nearly $300 million in physical damage. Aymond has allowed several churches to re-open for special occasions. The Diocese of Austin web site states that under his bishopric the number of seminarians increased threefold.

Introduction of the Roman Missal, third edition 
Aymond, while serving as chair of the United States Conference of Catholic Bishops' (USCCB) Committee on Divine Worship, announced on June 17, 2011, that beginning in September 2011, diocesan bishops may permit the gradual introduction of the musical settings of the people's parts of the Mass that are sung from the new translation of the Roman Missal. Primarily, this affects the Gloria, the Holy, Holy, Holy, and the different Memorial Acclamations. This variation to the implementation of the Roman Missal third edition, set to take place definitively on the First Sunday of Advent, November 27, 2011, was authorized by the conference's president, Archbishop Timothy Michael Dolan of New York.

Opinions and attitudes

Leadership style 
Bruce Nolan of the Times-Picayune describes Aymond as a "quiet pragmatist who prefers to promote Catholic values in and out of his church without the public confrontations some colleagues willingly accept." A June 16, 2009 editorial in the Times-Picayune praised as "a promising way to begin" Aymond's willingness to listen to his new flock.

Aymond has a reputation for taking on controversial issues in a direct and vocal way. He has called the confrontations a necessary part of being a bishop. "I don't feel I have a responsibility or an obligation to make people do what the church says", he said in 2008. "In fact, I think that would be wrong. But I do have an obligation to say, 'This is what the church's teaching is.

Abortion and contraception 
Aymond was one of more than 80 American bishops who wrote to the University of Notre Dame in South Bend, Indiana, to protest its award of an honorary degree to President Barack Obama due to his support of abortion rights for women and embryonic stem cell research.

In October 2007, Aymond objected to the scheduled appearance of dissident Catholic theologian Reverend Charles Curran at St. Edward University in South Austin. Curran is a priest whose Catholic theologian title was stripped by the Vatican because he openly condemned the church's teachings against abortion rights for women, artificial birth control, and human sexuality. St. Edward ignored Aymond's directive and went ahead with the event.

Gay rights 
Aymond also believes that homosexuals should remain celibate.

In June 2013, Aymond issued a statement of regret that his predecessor, Archbishop Philip Hannan, and the local church leadership ignored the 1973 arson attack on a gay bar in New Orleans that killed 32 people. Aymond wrote to Time magazine that In retrospect, if we did not release a statement we should have to be in solidarity with the victims and their families ... The church does not condone violence and hatred. If we did not extend our care and condolences, I deeply apologize.

Honors 
Gregory Michael Aymond KC*HS is knight commander with star and grand prior of the Southeastern Lieutenancy of the United States of America of the Order of the Holy Sepulchre.

Books 
 Aymond, Gregory Michael. Courageous Moral Leadership. Washington, DC: National Catholic Educational Association (NCEA), 2004. , .
 Sofield, Loughlan; Juliano, Carroll; & Aymond, Gregory Michael. Facing Forgiveness: A Catholic's Guide to Letting Go of Anger and Welcoming Reconciliation. Notre Dame, Indiana: Ave Maria Press, 2007. , .

See also

 Catholic Church hierarchy
 Catholic Church in the United States
 Historical list of the Catholic bishops of the United States
 List of Catholic bishops of the United States
 Lists of patriarchs, archbishops, and bishops

References

External links
 Roman Catholic Archdiocese of New Orleans
 Roman Catholic Diocese of Austin

Episcopal succession

1949 births
Living people
Brother Martin High School alumni
Roman Catholic archbishops of New Orleans
Roman Catholic writers
People from Austin, Texas
Knights of the Holy Sepulchre
Catholics from Texas
21st-century Roman Catholic archbishops in the United States